The Joint Committee on Human Rights is a joint committee of the Parliament of the United Kingdom. The remit of the committee is to consider human rights issues in the United Kingdom.

Membership
As of February 2023, the members of the committee are as follows:

See also
Joint Committee of the Parliament of the United Kingdom
Parliamentary Committees of the United Kingdom

References

External links

The records of the Joint Committee on Human Rights are held by the Parliamentary Archives

Human Rights
Select Committees of the British House of Commons

Human rights in the United Kingdom